In Irish legend Aibell (sometimes Aoibheall (modern Irish spelling), also anglicised as Aeval or Eevill) was the  guardian spirit of the Dál gCais, the Dalcassians or Ó Bríen clan. She was the ruler of a sídhe in north Munster, and her dwelling place was Craig Liath, the grey rock, a hill overlooking the Shannon about two miles north of Killaloe. Aibell also had a lover (called Dubhlainn Ua Artigan) and a magic harp (of which it was said "[w]hoever heard its music did not live long afterwards").

Name
The name Aoibhell may come from Gaelic aoibh, meaning "beauty" (or aoibhinn "beautiful"). Alternatively, as a theonym it could be derived from Proto-Celtic *Oibel-ā, literally "burning fire", which may have been a byword for the notion of "ardour"; the Romano-British equivalent of this Proto-Celtic theonym is likely to have been *Oebla. A variant name for the character is Áebinn.

Attestations

An Buachaill Caol Dubh
In Seán Ó Seanacháin's song An Buachaill Caol Dubh, Aoibheal appears to the "Dark Slender Boy" (representing alcohol addiction) and his friend the drinker. In the last verse Seanacháin expands by saying that, when Aoibheal met the two of them walking the road, she promised the lad a hundred men if he would let go of the poet. The lad replied that he was steadfast and true and would not desert his friends until they died. Thus Seán acknowledges his addiction will never disappear.

Lady Gregory

Cúirt An Mheán Oíche
Aoibheal also features prominently in the 18th-century comic poem Cúirt An Mheán Oíche by Brian Merriman. The poem begins by using the conventions of the Aisling, or vision poem, in which the poet is out walking when he has a vision of a woman from the other world. Typically, this woman is Ireland and the poem will lament her lot and/or call on her 'sons' to rebel against foreign tyranny. In Merriman's hands, the convention is made to take a satirical and deeply ironic twist.

In the opening section of the poem, a hideous female giant appears to the poet and drags him kicking and screaming to the court of Queen Aoibheal of the Fairies. On the way to the ruined monastery at Moinmoy, the messenger explains that the Queen, disgusted by the twin corruptions of Anglo-Irish landlords and English Law, has taken the dispensing of justice upon herself. There follows a traditional court case under the Brehon law form of a three-part debate.

In the first part, a young woman calls on Aoibheal declares her case against the young men of Ireland for their refusal to marry. She complains that, despite increasingly desperate attempts to capture a husband via intensive flirtation at hurling matches, wakes, and pattern days, the young men insist on ignoring her in favour of late marriages to much older women. The young woman further bewails the contempt with which she is treated by the married women of the village.

She is answered by an old man who first denounces the wanton promiscuity of young women in general, suggesting that the young woman who spoke before was conceived by a Tinker under a cart. He vividly describes the infidelity of his own young wife. He declares his humiliation at finding her already pregnant on their wedding night and the gossip which has surrounded the "premature" birth of "his" son ever since. He disgustedly attacks the dissolute lifestyles of young women in general. Then, however, he declares that there is nothing wrong with his illegitimate children and denounces marriage as "out of date." He demands that the Queen outlaw it altogether and replace it with a system of free love.

The young woman, however, is infuriated by the old' man's words and is barely restrained from physically attacking him. She mocks his impotent failure to fulfill his marital duties with his young wife, who was a homeless beggar who married him to avoid starvation. The young woman then argues that if his wife has taken a lover, she well deserves one. The young woman then calls for the abolition of priestly celibacy, alleging that priests would otherwise make wonderful husbands and fathers. In the meantime, however, she will keep trying to attract an older man in hopes that her unmarried humiliation will finally end.

Finally, in the judgement section Queen Aoibheal rules that all laymen must marry before the age of 21, on pain of corporal punishment at the hands of Ireland's women. She advises them to equally target the romantically indifferent, homosexuals, and skirt chasers who boast of the number of women they have used and discarded. Aoibheal tells them to be careful, however, not to leave any man unable to father children. She also states that abolishing priestly celibacy is something only the Vatican can do and counsels patience.

To the poet's horror, the younger woman angrily points him out as a 30-year-old bachelor and describes her many failed attempts to attract his interest in hopes of becoming his wife. She declares that he must be the first man to suffer the consequences of the new marriage law. As a crowd of infuriated women prepares to flog him into a quivering bowl of jelly, he awakens to find it was all a terrible nightmare.

See also
Clíodhna

References

 
Dál gCais
Irish goddesses
Fairy royalty
Tutelary goddesses